The Battle of Sark, alternatively called the Battle of Lochmaben Stone, was fought between England and Scotland in October 1448. A large battle, it was the first significant Scottish victory over the English in over half a century, since the Battle of Otterburn in 1388. It placed the Scots in a position of strength against the English for over a decade, until Edward IV ascended the English throne, and it brought the powerful Douglas family to even greater prominence in Scotland.

Precursors
After the 14th century's Wars of Scottish Independence, England and Scotland continued to battle periodically along their borders. In 1448, hostilities escalated. Henry Percy, son of the Earl of Northumberland, destroyed Dunbar in May, and in June the Earl of Salisbury, Lord Warden of the March destroyed Dumfries. In reaction, William Douglas, 8th Earl of Douglas mustered a force with the support of the earls of Ormonde, Angus, and Orkney, destroying Warkworth and Alnwick. When the Scots advanced further into Cumberland and Northumberland, Henry VI authorized the Percies to retaliate.

Engagement
The stage for the battle was set when, in October, the Earl of Northumberland led a troop of 6,000 men into Scotland, where they made camp near the Lochmaben Stone. Their location proved poorly chosen, as they settled in a tidal waterway between the River Sark and Kirtle Water. Among the Scots, Hugh Douglas, Earl of Ormonde, mustered a force of 4,000 from Annandale and Nithsdale, marching against Northumberland on 23 October 1448. Northumberland organized his troops in three divisions. Magnus Reidman, a celebrated veteran of the Hundred Years' War in France commanded one wing. Sir John Pennington, with a large group of Welshmen, formed the other wing. The bulk of the forces were in the centre, commanded by Northumberland himself. Ormonde mirrored this arrangement. He had Sir John Wallace of Cragie oppose Magnus, and against Sir John Pennington sent the knight of Carlaverock, called Lord Maxwell, and Sir Adam Johnston, Laird of Johnston, with many inland gentlemen. Ormonde and his retinue opposed Northumberland at the centre. Forces on both sides contained a large contingent of plate armoured men-at-arms, some possibly mounted. At the beginning of the engagement, the English opened fire, pelting the Scottish ranks with the arrows of the English longbow. After enduring some volleys, the Scots, in avoidance of a repeat of Homildon Hill, made a daring advance. It is said that Wallace cried out with a loud voice, so as he was heard by his followers, "why should we stand still thus to be wounded afar off? follow me, says he, and let us join in hand-strokes, where true valour is to be seen!" The Scots charged, and at arm's length the English, being sorely pressed by axe, spear, and halberd, were routed, with Magnus being slain in the melee. When their ranks broke, they were caught by the rising tide, in which a large number drowned. A great number of prisoners were taken, amongst whom were Sir John Pennington, and Sir Robert Harrington, and the Lord Percy son to the Earl of Northumberland, taken while he helped his father to his horse, who thereby escaped capture.

Casualties
Different sources report the number of Scots who lost their lives in the engagement variously: from as few as 26  to as many as 600. The number of English deaths in the same sources varies from 2,000 (1,500 killed in battle; 500 drowned) to 3,000 killed and drowned. In the light of the nature of the battle 26 casualties for the Scots seems far too low, given the barrage of arrows and the death of Wallace of Cragie and Reidman, both Scottish and English commanding officers respectively. This wouldn't happen unless there was a fairly heavy engagement. A larger number of scholarly sources also seem to prefer numbers given by Pitscottie.

References

Further reading 
 Brenan, Gerald A History of the House of Percy, from the Earliest Times Down to the Present Century, Volume 1 1902. pg.101 |
 Griffiths, R. A., The Reign of Henry VI, 1981.
 Hodgkin, T., The Warden of the Northern Marches, 1908.
 Neilson, G., The Battle of Sark, in Transactions of the Dumfriesshire and Galloway Antiquarian and Natural History Society, vol. 13 1898.
 Paterson, Raymond Campbell, My Wound is Deep: History of the Anglo-Scottish Wars, 1380-1560, 1997.

External links
 

1448 in Scotland
Battles between England and Scotland
Battle of Sark
Battles of the Middle Ages
Conflicts in 1448
1448 in England
15th-century military history of Scotland